Parliamentary elections were held in Georgia on 8 October 2016 to elect the 150 members of Parliament. The ruling Georgian Dream coalition, led by Prime Minister Giorgi Kvirikashvili, sought a second term in office. Opposition parties included the former ruling party and main opposition, the United National Movement (ENM); the Free Democrats, formerly a member of the Georgian Dream coalition and led by Irakli Alasania; and the Alliance of Patriots of Georgia.

Georgian Dream won 115 seats, an increase of 30 seats, while the United National Movement was reduced to 27 seats.

Electoral system
The 150 members of the unicameral Parliament are elected by two methods: 77 by proportional representation in a single nationwide constituency with an electoral threshold of 5%, and 73 by two-round system in single-member constituencies with majority rule requiring the winner to get over 50% (in the previous election the first-placed candidate had to pass a 30% threshold to win a constituency seat).

The boundaries of constituencies were re-drawn to reduce the malapportionment effect. Previously, the size of electorates ranged from fewer than 6,000 voters in one district to over 150,000 voters in another.

The elections did not take place in constituencies in the breakaway regions of Abkhazia and South Ossetia.

Opinion polls

Results
Georgian Dream declared victory soon after voting ended. Georgian Dream Prime Minister Giorgi Kvirikashvili told supporters at party headquarters that "I congratulate you with a big victory Georgia! According to all preliminary results, Georgian Dream is leading with a big advantage." Georgia Dream Deputy Prime Minister Kakha Kaladze added that the party's own data showed that it had won around 59 percent of the vote.

By Constituency

Notes

References

Georgia
Parliamentary
Election and referendum articles with incomplete results
Georgia
Parliamentary elections in Georgia (country)